Leonard Aloysius Scott Stokes (1858 – 25 December 1925) was an English architect and artist.

Leonard Stokes was born in Southport (then in Lancashire) in 1858 the son of Scott Nasmyth Stokes, a school inspector.  He trained in London and travelled in Germany and Italy. Most of his designs were for Roman Catholic buildings, including churches, convents and schools.  His first work was Sacred Heart Church, Exeter. He also designed St Joseph's Church, Maidenhead, in 1884, and the Church of St Clare, Liverpool, which was completed in 1890.  He also designed country houses and around 20 telephone exchanges.  In 1919 he was awarded the Royal Gold Medal of the Royal Institute of British Architects, having served as their president from 1910 to 1912. Sir Albert Edward Richardson, who later became president of the Royal Society, trained in his offices.

His brother Wilfred Stokes was an engineer and inventor.
His nephew Richard Stokes was a Labour MP and minister.

He died in 1925 in Chelsea, London and is buried at St Mary Magdalen Roman Catholic Church, Mortlake.

References

Further reading 
 
 
  (also published in Architecture in 1926)

1858 births
1925 deaths
19th-century English architects
20th-century English architects
Architects from Lancashire
Burials at St Mary Magdalen Roman Catholic Church Mortlake
English ecclesiastical architects
People from Southport
Presidents of the Royal Institute of British Architects
Recipients of the Royal Gold Medal
People of the Royal Commission on the Historical Monuments of England